Roberto L. Pettit  is a neighbourhood (barrio) of Asunción, Paraguay. It is named after Roberto Pettit.

Neighbourhoods of Asunción